Toumodi is a town in south-central Ivory Coast. It is a sub-prefecture of and the seat of Toumodi Department in Bélier Region, Lacs District. Toumodi is also a commune.

In 2021, the population of the sub-prefecture of Toumodi was 88,580.

Villages
The 30 villages of the sub-prefecture of Toumodi and their population in 2014 are:

References

Sub-prefectures of Bélier
Communes of Bélier